Marietta Township may refer to one of the following places in the United States:

 Marietta Township, Marshall County, Iowa
 Marietta Township, Saunders County, Nebraska
 Marietta Township, Washington County, Ohio

Township name disambiguation pages